Zenon Stanisław Nowosz (born 6 February 1944 in Warsaw) is a Polish sprinter who participated in world athletics for Poland in the late 1960s and 1970s. He competed in the 60 metres,  100 metres and 200 metres.

Nowosz won a bronze medal at the 1969 European Championships in Athletics in Athens in 200 metres. At the 1971 Championships in Helsinki he won a silver medal in 4 x 100 metres relay. He became a European Champion at 1978 Championships in Prague in 4 x 100 metres relay.

He also won a silver medal in Vienna in 60 metres at the 1970 European Indoor Championships in Athletics, behind winner Valeriy Borzov. At the same distance he on a gold medal at 1973 Championships in Rotterdam.

Nowosz participated in three Olympic Games: in 1968 Mexico City, 1972 Munich and 1976 Montreal.

References
 
 European Indoor Championships

Polish male sprinters
Athletes (track and field) at the 1968 Summer Olympics
Athletes (track and field) at the 1972 Summer Olympics
Athletes (track and field) at the 1976 Summer Olympics
Olympic athletes of Poland
1944 births
Living people
Athletes from Warsaw
European Athletics Championships medalists
Legia Warsaw athletes
Universiade medalists in athletics (track and field)
Universiade gold medalists for Poland
Medalists at the 1970 Summer Universiade
20th-century Polish people